Hypercompe detecta is a moth of the family Erebidae first described by Charles Oberthür in 1881. It is found in Brazil.

Subspecies
Hypercompe detecta detecta
Hypercompe detecta dorsata (Forbes, 1929)

References

detecta
Moths described in 1881